Nicholas Britell (born October 17, 1980) is an American film composer. He has scored both of Barry Jenkins's studio films, Moonlight (2016) and If Beale Street Could Talk (2018), both of which received nominations for Best Original Score at the Academy Awards. He has also worked with Adam McKay, scoring his three most recent films, The Big Short (2015), Vice (2018), and Don't Look Up (2021), the latter receiving a nomination for Best Original Score at the Academy Awards and the Hollywood Music in Media award for Best Original Score. 

The HBO original series Succession (2018–present) marked Britell's entry into television. Britell scored all three seasons, earning the Emmy Award for Outstanding Original Main Title Theme Music and the Hollywood Music in Media Award for Best Original Score – TV Show/Limited Series. His score for the second season of Succession was nominated in 2020 for the Emmy Award for Outstanding Music Composition for a Series. His score for The Underground Railroad was nominated for Outstanding Music Composition for a Limited or Anthology Series, Movie or Special (Original Dramatic Score) at the 73rd Primetime Emmy Awards.

At the World Soundtrack Awards, Britell was awarded Film Composer of the Year in 2019 for his scores for Vice and If Beale Street Could Talk and Television Composer of the Year in 2020 for Succession. Britell also won Best Original Song at the 2021 ceremony alongside Florence Welch for "Call Me Cruella", written for Cruella. His works, as described by Soraya McDonald of Film Comment, "seem to organically straddle accessibility and sophistication in a way that goes beyond the typical programming of a big-city pops orchestra...That might have something to do with the fact that Britell has long had one foot in the world of hip-hop and another in the world of classical music."

Early life and education
Britell was raised in a Jewish family, in New York City. He graduated valedictorian from the college preparatory school Hopkins School in 1999. Britell is a graduate of the Juilliard School's Pre-College Division and a Phi Beta Kappa graduate of Harvard University in 2003. At school, he was a member of the instrumental hip-hop group, The Witness Protection Program, in which he played keyboards and synthesizers. Britell is part of an emerging generation of composers and artists who draw from an eclectic range of influences. His work is inspired by Rachmaninoff, Gershwin, Philip Glass, and Zbigniew Preisner, Quincy Jones and Dr. Dre.

Career

Early career 
In 2008, Britell gained wide notice performing his own work "Forgotten Waltz No. 2" in Natalie Portman's directorial debut Eve. He collaborated again with Portman, writing music for the film New York, I Love You. In 2011, Britell performed on piano with violin virtuoso Tim Fain in "Portals." The multimedia project also featured performances by Craig Black, Julia Eichten and Haylee Nichele and featured music by Philip Glass and Nico Muhly, poetry by Leonard Cohen and choreography by Benjamin Millepied. Vogue Magazine called Britell among "...the most talented young artists at work..."

As a film composer, Britell created the music for the movie Gimme the Loot directed by Adam Leon. The film would go on to compete in the Un Certain Regard section at the 2012 Cannes Film Festival. It won the Grand Jury Prize at the SXSW Film Festival in 2012. The music for the film garnered special praise from New York Magazine and Variety. Britell's film composing career continued in 2012 with the scoring of Michele Mitchell's PBS documentary Haiti: Where Did the Money Go? The film, which aired over 1,000 times in the United States on PBS stations and was screened at the Oakland Film Festival and the Bolder Life Film Festival in 2012, is the winner of the 2013 National Edward R. Murrow Award for Best News Documentary and winner of a 2012 CINE Golden Eagle Award and a CINE Special Jury Award for Best Investigative Documentary.

2012–2015 
Britell's music featured prominently in director Steve McQueen's Oscar-winning film 12 Years a Slave, for which he composed and arranged the on-camera music including the spiritual songs, work songs, featured violin performances, and dances. Billboard Magazine called Britell "...the secret weapon in the music of 12 Years a Slave". "My Lord Sunshine", composed by Britell for 12 Years a Slave, was eligible for the 2014 Oscar's best song list. The Los Angeles Times said of "My Lord Sunshine", "A work song, a spiritual, a blues lament, a communal statement – 'My Lord Sunshine (Sunrise)' is all of the above and more...[w]hat Britell accomplished is no easy feat, and it's a spiritual that feels and sounds of the era and deftly weaves in religious imagery with the daily horror of the slaves' lives." Britell also notably reinterpreted "Roll Jordan Roll" for the film. Britell's work received wide critical acclaim and he was profiled in the Wall Street Journal.

As a film producer, Britell produced the short film Whiplash, directed by Damien Chazelle, which won the Jury Award for Best US Fiction Short at the 2013 Sundance Film Festival. He subsequently helped produce the feature-film Whiplash, also directed by Chazelle and starring Miles Teller and J. K. Simmons. The Whiplash feature won Sundance's 2014 Jury Prize and Audience Award, and went on to get 5 Oscar nominations (including Best Picture) and won 3 Oscar awards. Britell also wrote and produced the track "Reaction," produced the track "When I Wake," and performed and produced "No Two Words" for the film's soundtrack.

In 2015, Britell scored The Seventh Fire, a documentary directed by Jack Pettibone Riccobono and presented by Terrence Malick, which debuted to critical acclaim at the Berlin International Film Festival.

Britell scored Natalie Portman's directorial debut feature film A Tale of Love and Darkness, which screened at the 2015 Cannes Film Festival. Deadline called Britell's score for the film "riveting".

Britell also scored the Oscar-winning The Big Short, directed by Adam McKay, starring Brad Pitt, Christian Bale, Ryan Gosling, and Steve Carell, based on the book The Big Short by Michael Lewis, and released by Paramount in December 2015. In addition, Britell produced the soundtrack album for the film.

2016–2019 
In 2016, Britell scored director Gary Ross's civil-war era historical drama Free State of Jones, starring among others Matthew McConaughey and Mahershala Ali. The soundtrack album, produced by Britell, was released June 24, 2016 on Sony Masterworks.

Also in 2016, Britell wrote the original score for the critically acclaimed, Best Picture-winning film Moonlight, directed by Barry Jenkins and starring Mahershala Ali, Ashton Sanders, Trevante Rhodes, André Holland, and Naomie Harris, among others. Britell's score received a 2017 Academy Award for Best Original Score nomination and it was nominated for a 2017 Golden Globe Award for Best Original Score in the Motion Picture category. The New York Times' A.O. Scott, who called the film "...about as beautiful a movie as you are ever likely to see", praised Britell's score as "...both surprising and perfect." Britell's original score was described as "... an enthralling collection of music that will linger in your mind and in your heart in much the same way as the film", and named one of the Ten Best Music Moments of 2016 by Brooklyn Magazine. The film's soundtrack album, named one of the top 25 Soundtrack Albums of 2016 on iTunes, was produced by Britell and released by Lakeshore Records, including a special vinyl collectors' edition. Britell's "Middle of the World", from the soundtrack album, was named one of the top 25 Soundtrack Songs of 2016 on iTunes.

Britell scored director Adam Leon's film Tramps in 2016, with Netflix acquiring worldwide distribution rights to the film at the 2016 Toronto International Film Festival.

He composed the title song from Christina Aguilera's eighth studio album Liberation (2018).

Britell scored Fox Searchlight's tennis biopic Battle of the Sexes, directed by Jonathan Dayton and Valerie Faris, and released in 2017.

His score for Jenkins' If Beale Street Could Talk has received wide critical acclaim and awards including a 2019 Academy Award nomination, a BAFTA nomination, a Critics' Choice nomination, and Best Original Score awards from each of the Los Angeles, Boston, Chicago, Central Ohio, Iowa, Washington DC, Phoenix, LA Online, NY Online, and Online Film Critics Associations.

Britell is the composer of the HBO series Succession, winning a Primetime Emmy Award for Outstanding Original Main Title Theme Music for the series. He composed season 3 of Succession, which aired during fall 2021.

2020–present 
On February 6, 2019, Britell confirmed he is composing the score for Barry Jenkins' next project, The Underground Railroad, an original series on Amazon based on Colson Whitehead's Pulitzer Prize winning novel of the same name. The show premiered on Amazon Video on May 14, 2021 to critical acclaim for both Jenkins and Britell. For his score, Britell received a Primetime Emmy Award nomination for Outstanding Music Composition For A Limited Or Anthology Series, Movie Or Special (Original Dramatic Score) at the 73rd Primetime Emmy Awards.

Britell composed the music for Adam McKay's 2021 film Don't Look Up, including the song "Just Look Up" performed by Ariana Grande and Kid Cudi. Britell also scored Disney's One Hundred and One Dalmatians live-action spin-off Cruella, also released in 2021. Britell received a nomination for Best Original Score at the 94th Academy Awards for the score of Don't Look Up.

On February 16, 2022, it was reported that Britell would be composing the score for the Star Wars streaming series Andor on Disney+.

Other endeavors 
Britell is a Steinway Artist and a Creative Associate of the Juilliard School. In December 2018, it was announced that Britell would be a part of Esa-Pekka Salonen's newly formed creative collective "brain trust" as Salonen takes the reins as music director of the San Francisco Symphony.

Personal life
He is married to cellist Caitlin Sullivan.

Filmography

As performer

As composer

Film

Television

As producer

Awards

References

External links
 Official website
 

1980 births
21st-century American Jews
21st-century American pianists
American film score composers
American male film score composers
Composers from New York City
Harvard University alumni
Jewish American film score composers
Juilliard School Pre-College Division alumni
Living people
Musicians from New York City
Primetime Emmy Award winners